Dragons, commonly referred to as DreamWorks Dragons, is an American computer-animated television series based on the 2010 film How to Train Your Dragon. The series serves as a bridge between the first film and its 2014 sequel.

Jay Baruchel, America Ferrera, Christopher Mintz-Plasse, T.J. Miller, and David Tennant reprise their voice-acting roles from the film. Other cast members include Julie Marcus and Andree Vermeulen as Ruffnut (previously voiced by Kristen Wiig), Zack Pearlman as Snotlout (previously voiced by Jonah Hill), Chris Edgerly as Gobber the Belch (previously voiced by Craig Ferguson), and Nolan North as Stoick the Vast (previously voiced by Gerard Butler).

Dragons was announced by Cartoon Network on October 12, 2010. According to Tim Johnson, executive producer for the film, the series was planned to be much darker and deeper than DreamWorks Animation's previous television series spin-offs, with a similar tone to the film. Dragons was the first DreamWorks Animation series to air on Cartoon Network rather than Nickelodeon.

A one-hour preview consisting of two episodes aired on August 7, 2012, on Cartoon Network, with the official premiere of the series airing on September 5, 2012. A total of 40 episodes aired on Cartoon Network during the first two seasons, subtitled Riders of Berk and Defenders of Berk respectively.

Afterwards, the series was subtitled Race to the Edge, the first season of which debuted on Netflix on June 26, 2015. The second and third seasons of Dragons: Race to the Edge premiered on January 8 and June 24, 2016, respectively. The fourth season was released on February 17, 2017. The series was renewed for a fifth season, which was released on Netflix on August 25, 2017. The series (alongside the Netflix exclusive, All Hail King Julien) is syndicated as part of the newly rebranded Universal Kids on September 9, 2017. Dragons: Race to the Edge was renewed for the sixth and final season which was released on February 16, 2018.

Plot
Taking place between How to Train Your Dragon and How to Train Your Dragon 2, DreamWorks Dragons follows Hiccup as he tries to keep balance within the new cohabitation of Dragons and Vikings. Alongside keeping up with Berk's newest installment—A Dragon Training Academy—Hiccup, Toothless, and the rest of the Viking Teens are put to the test when they are faced with new worlds harsher than Berk, new dragons that can't all be trained, and new enemies who are looking for every reason to destroy the harmony between Vikings and Dragons altogether.

Characters

Dragon Riders
 Hiccup Horrendous Haddock, III  (voiced by Jay Baruchel) – An awkward and underweight Viking and son of the chief of Berk. He and his dragon, Toothless, share the strongest bond of all riders and dragons. He is the ancestor of Olivia and Thomas in Dragons: The Nine Realms.
 Toothless – An extremely rare, male Night Fury befriended by Hiccup, and the dragon that lost his left tail fin in the first feature film.  Toothless has dark black scales, retractable teeth, and the ability to shoot plasma blasts.  Toothless also has the unique ability to navigate in dark places using echolocation.
 Astrid Hofferson (voiced by America Ferrera) – Hiccup's close friend and partner; and the unofficial second-in-command of the dragon training academy. She has a strong character, is one of the most courageous of the Dragon Riders, and is very competitive. She has a strong bond with her dragon, Stormfly. During Season 5 of Race to the Edge, Hiccup gives Astrid a betrothal necklace, making them officially engaged to be married.
 Stormfly – A blue, female Deadly Nadder befriended by Astrid. Like Hiccup and Toothless, Astrid and Stormfly display exceptional teamwork. Stormfly and Toothless share a friendly rivalry in most of the competitions Hiccup and Astrid devise. In addition to her magnesium-fueled fire bursts, Stormfly can launch spines from her tail.
 Fishlegs Ingerman (voiced by Christopher Mintz-Plasse) – One of Hiccup's close friends; has a great encyclopedic knowledge of dragons. He is not as courageous as the other Dragon Riders, but is a loyal friend, especially to Hiccup and Astrid. He has formed a very close relationship with his dragon, Meatlug.
 Meatlug – A brown, female Gronckle who bonded with Fishlegs. Because of her husky size and short wingspan, she lacks the aerobatic maneuverability and speed of the other dragons. She and Fishlegs have a very close, nurturing relationship. She also can eat a particular combination of iron ore and rocks and regurgitate a valuable metal known as "Gronckle iron".
 Snotlout Jorgenson (voiced by Zack Pearlman) –  One of Hiccup's friends; reckless, quarrelsome, and often seen mocking or annoying the other riders. He has a complicated relationship with his dragon, Hookfang.
 Hookfang – A red, male Monstrous Nightmare, ridden by Snotlout. Hookfang has a habit of attacking Snotlout or abandoning him when Snotlout tries to assert dominance, and does not always pay attention to Snotlout. In battle, Hookfang covers his skin with his flammable saliva and sets it on fire, without harming himself; this ability is almost never used when Snotlout is riding him.
 Tuffnut Thorston (voiced by T. J. Miller) and Ruffnut Thorston (voiced by Julie Marcus (season 1) and Andree Vermeulen (seasons 2–8)) – Male and female fraternal twins and followers of Hiccup. They constantly quarrel and disobey commands. 
 Barf and Belch – A green, male, two-headed Hideous Zippleback jointly ridden by the twins, normally with Ruffnut riding the dragon's right head, named Barf (which can exhale explosive gas), and Tuffnut riding the dragon's left head, named Belch (which can ignite the gas). The heads are usually agreeable, but can have difficulty flying when their riders disagree, and sometimes quarrel as a result.

Notable inhabitants of Berk
 Stoick the Vast (voiced by Nolan North) – The Chief of Berk and father to Hiccup; immensely strong, fearless, fierce, and possessed of shrewd judgement and compassion. His first dragon is a Thunderdrum named Thornado, who is later released back into the wild. His second dragon is Skullcrusher, a Rumblehorn.
 Gobber the Belch (voiced by Chris Edgerly) – The blacksmith of Berk, Stoick's closest friend, and Hiccup's mentor. Later he is seen riding a Hotburple named Grump.
 Spitelout Jorgenson (voiced by David Tennant) – Snotlout's father. Spitelout takes pride in his son's achievements, but seldom forgives his failures. He is a member of the A-team and rides a Deadly Nadder named Kingstail.
 Gustav Larson (voiced by Lucas Grabeel) – Gustav is a teenager who aspires to be a Dragon Rider. He takes Snotlout as his model and hero, especially in the first two seasons. He becomes the leader of Berk's A-Team and he rides a Monstrous Nightmare named Fanghook, based on Hookfang's name.
 Gothi (voiced by Angela Bartys) – The village's shaman. As a mute, she communicates by gesturing or drawing lines and hieroglyphic-like pictures, translated by Gobber or Fishlegs. She rides a Gronckle as part of the A-team.
 Mildew (voiced by Stephen Root) – Mildew is a cantankerous, spiteful, aged and generally disliked Berk local. He is a cabbage farmer and retains a strong hatred of dragons.
 Bucket (voiced by Thomas F. Wilson) – A mentally impaired Viking, named for the bucket he wears on his head, allegedly to conceal a missing part of his brain. When the bucket grows tighter, the locals regard this as an early storm warning.
 Mulch (voiced by Tim Conway (seasons 1–2) and Tom Kenny (seasons 3–8)) – Bucket's closest friend, usually seen by his side and frequently picking up the slack for Bucket.

Villains
 Johann (voiced by Michael Goldstrom) – A seafaring merchant who occasionally visits Berk and trades mostly in curiosities. Prior to Dragons: Race to the Edge Season 5, he was thought to be an ally of the Dragon Riders. However, in the finale of Season 5, it is revealed that he has been undercover and is secretly working with Krogan to find and control a Bewilderbeast. He meets his end in "King of Dragons, Part 2", when the Bewilderbeast uses its ice to freeze him to death.
 Krogan (voiced by Hakeem Kae-Kazim) – The leader of the Dragon Flyers who works for Drago Bludvist. His overconfidence often clashes with Viggo's patience. When he fails to retrieve a Bewilderbeast for his master in “King of Dragons, Part 2”, Drago has him executed.
 Viggo Grimborn (voiced by Alfred Molina) – The leader of the Dragon Hunters and is usually accompanied by his older brother, Ryker Grimborn. Viggo is less strong than his brother, but for what he lacks in build he makes up for in intellect, frequently tricking and outsmarting the Dragon Riders. In "Triple Cross", he is betrayed by Johann and Krogan and has a change of heart before sacrificing himself to allow Hiccup and Toothless to escape.
 Ryker Grimborn (voiced by JB Blanc) – The second-in-command of the Dragon Hunters and the elder brother of Viggo Grimborn. Ryker is physically stronger and more stubborn than his younger brother. He is killed in "Shell Shocked, Part 2" when the Submaripper swallows his ship.
 Savage (voiced by Paul Rugg) – Alvin's right-hand man and later that of Dagur before he goes on his own in Dragons: Race to the Edge Season 4. In "Something Rotten on Berserker Island", he attempts to overthrow Dagur to become the new Chief of the Berserker Tribe, only to be defeated and imprisoned by him.

Secondary characters
 Alvin the Treacherous (voiced by Mark Hamill) – Exiled from Berk for unspecified treachery (later revealed to be catching innocent bystanders in the crossfire of a dragon attack), he plots to displace his old friend, Stoick. He later becomes an ally of Berk at the end of Season 2.
 Heather (voiced by Mae Whitman) – A mysterious teenage girl found by the Viking youths. Although she was at first introduced for actions against Berk, her true motive, to rescue her parents from Alvin the Treacherous, proved her loyalty. She returns in Season 3, bonding with a Razorwhip dragon named Windshear. She is later revealed to be Dagur's long-lost sister and pretends to be in league with him in order to get close to him and the newly unveiled dragon hunters. She leaves to parts unknown after her plot is uncovered by Viggo. She soon returns, showing romantic feelings for Fishlegs and joins the Dragon Riders. After being with the Dragon Riders for a while, she decides to leave for Berserker Island with her brother, Dagur.
 Dagur the Deranged (voiced by David Faustino) – A villain-turned-ally and leader of the Berserker Tribe. He becomes obsessed with plotting to hunt and capture Toothless. He is later revealed to be the long-lost brother of Heather. After Dragons: Race to the Edge Season Two, he begins to acknowledge the aims of the Dragon Riders and starts to help them, along with his sister, Heather. Later, Dagur becomes a Dragon Rider with a Gronckle he named Shattermaster, and later on, Sleuther, a Triple Stryke that the Dragon Riders had previously rescued. In Season 6, he falls in love with and eventually marries Mala. Though he acts tough and aggressive, he is also rather sensitive.
 Defenders of the Wing – A tribe of warriors who first appear in the episode "Defenders of the Wing: Part 1". They worship dragons as holy beings and are led by Queen Mala (voiced by Adelaide Kane). They are at war with the Dragon Hunters and are therefore extremely distrusting of outsiders. Prior to encountering the Dragon Riders, they know nothing of riding or training dragons, as their culture forbids it. They live on a volcanic island home to an enormous dragon called the Eruptodon. They worship and protect the Eruptodon at all cost, as it feeds on the volcano's lava and prevents their village from being destroyed. Mala later falls in love with and marries Dagur the Deranged.
 Wingmaidens – An exclusively female warrior tribe led by their chieftess Atali (voiced by Rose McIver) who first appear in the episode "Snotlout’s Angels". They care for baby Razorwhips who become their wings until they are old enough to fend for themselves because the adult males of the species would devour the infants and could drive the species to extinction.

Episodes

Production
On October 12, 2010, it was announced that Cartoon Network had acquired worldwide broadcast rights to a weekly animated series based on the film. According to Tim Johnson, executive producer for How to Train Your Dragon, the series was planned to be much darker and deeper than DreamWorks Animation's previous television series spin-offs, with a similar tone to the film, and would follow after the events of the first film. DreamWorks Dragons is the first DreamWorks Animation series to air on Cartoon Network; DreamWorks Animation's previous television series, including The Penguins of Madagascar, Kung Fu Panda: Legends of Awesomeness, and Monsters vs. Aliens, had aired on Nickelodeon.

Although it was initially announced that the series would be called Dragons: The Series, the San Diego Comic-Con schedule announced in June 2012 revealed the new title to be Dragons: Riders of Berk. The second season of the show was titled Dragons: Defenders of Berk. At the end of May 2014, DreamWorks Animation announced that the series would move to Netflix in spring 2015.

Reception

Critical response
Dragons: Riders of Berk has received positive reviews. Brian Lowry of Variety reviewed the series: "The program is dazzling visually, and pretty effortlessly picks up where the narrative left off," although he noted the initial episodes' "lack of actual villains" and "not-particularly-stirring array of characters". Mary McNamara of Los Angeles Times said that it "retains both the personality and production value of its progenitor. Dragons promise to be lively and entertaining, with great visuals of dragons swooping and soaring." She praised its look: "It looks pretty dang spectacular even by today's standards. It's so crisply drawn and fluid that a person of a certain age would be forgiven for wondering how on earth we survived with things like Scooby-Doo and The Perils of Penelope Pitstop." According to Nielsen Media Research, episodes of the first season ranked on average #1 in their timeslot among boys 2–14.

Accolades

Video games
A 3D Unity-based in-browser game, titled Dragons: Wild Skies, was launched on August 27, 2012, on CartoonNetwork.com. Players will go through a tutorial with Hiccup, and train a Deadly Nadder, before being able to free roam around the several islands in the Barbaric Archipelago, with dragons scattered around them. The player can choose to be a blonde/brunette male or female Viking, before setting off to explore the islands. To train a dragon, players must feed the dragons correct food before doing correct gestures to gain the dragon's trust. In the game, players do not die or otherwise fail. Players complete challenges to earn gold for buying tools to obtain food for training dragons. The overworld consists of six islands, each with a unique dragon to tame. The number of dragons and worlds to explore is set to expand over time, as the series introduces more and more places and dragons...

Home media
A DVD collection of the first four episodes, titled Dragons: Riders of Berk, was released on November 20, 2012. The first season of the series was released on DVD in two parts on July 23, 2013. Dragons: Riders of Berk: Part 1 contained episodes from 1 to 11, and Dragons: Riders of Berk: Part 2, episodes from 12 to 20. In December 2013, Walmart released an exclusive pack containing the Complete 1st Season in a special edition "Toothless" plastic package. A DVD collection of the first 10 episodes of the second season, titled Dragons: Defenders of Berk: Part 1, was released on March 25, 2014. The second part, titled Dragons: Defenders of Berk: Part 2, was later released on May 27, 2014. On February 12, 2019, the first two seasons of Dragons: Race to the Edge was released on DVD in one set. Seasons three and four were released on DVD on March 5, 2019, and seasons five and six were released on DVD on March 26, 2019, albeit all only in Region 1 format.

References

External links
  at Cartoon Network
  at DreamWorks TV
 Dragons: Race to the Edge on Netflix
 
 
 

How to Train Your Dragon
2010s American animated television series
2012 American television series debuts
2018 American television series endings
English-language Netflix original programming
American computer-animated television series
Interquel television series
Television series by DreamWorks Animation
Television series by 20th Century Fox Television
Television series set in the Middle Ages
Television series set in the Viking Age
Animated television shows based on films
Cartoon Network original programming
BBC children's television shows
Amputees in fiction
American children's animated action television series
American children's animated adventure television series
American children's animated drama television series
American children's animated fantasy television series
Animated television series about dragons
Annie Award winners